2127 Tanya, provisional designation , is a carbonaceous asteroid from the outer region of the asteroid belt, approximately 40 kilometers in diameter. It was discovered on 29 May 1971, by Russian astronomer Lyudmila Chernykh at the Crimean Astrophysical Observatory in Nauchnij, on the Crimean peninsula. It was named in memory of Tanya Savicheva, a Russian child diarist during World War II.

Orbit 

Tanya is a carbonaceous C-type asteroid, that orbits the Sun in the outer main-belt at a distance of 3.1–3.3 AU once every 5 years and 9 months (2,101 days). Its orbit has an eccentricity of 0.03 and an inclination of 13° with respect to the ecliptic.

Lightcurve 

In October 2013, a rotational lightcurve of Tanya was obtained from photometric observations at the Palomar Transient Factory in California. Lightcurve analysis gave a rotation period of 7.8640 hours with a brightness variation of 0.18 magnitude.

Diameter and albedo 

According to the surveys carried out by the Infrared Astronomical Satellite IRAS, the Japanese Akari satellite, and NASA's Wide-field Infrared Survey Explorer with its subsequent NEOWISE mission, Tanya measures between 37.736 and 43.89 kilometers in diameter, and its surface has a low albedo between 0.03 and 0.055. The Collaborative Asteroid Lightcurve Link assumes a standard albedo for carbonaceous asteroids of 0.057 and calculates a much smaller diameter of 30.18 kilometers based on an absolute magnitude of 11.33.

Naming 

This minor planet was named by the discover for the memory of the young Russian girl Tanya Savicheva (1930–1944), who died after the Siege of Leningrad (1941–1944) on the Eastern Front during World War II. She wrote a well-known diary, describing the death of her parents and other relatives. The approved naming citation was published by the Minor Planet Center on 1 April 1980.

References

External links 
 (2127) Tanya at the Asteroids Dynamic Site
 Asteroid Lightcurve Database (LCDB), query form (info )
 Dictionary of Minor Planet Names, Google books
 Asteroids and comets rotation curves, CdR – Observatoire de Genève, Raoul Behrend
 Discovery Circumstances: Numbered Minor Planets (1)-(5000) – Minor Planet Center
 
 

002127
Discoveries by Lyudmila Chernykh
Named minor planets
19710529